Oulad Abbou is a town in Berrechid Province, Casablanca-Settat, Morocco. According to the 2014 Moroccan census it recorded a population of 11,299, up from 10,748 in the 2004 census.

References

Populated places in Berrechid Province
Municipalities of Morocco